A Night Out With Friends is a two disc live album by Richard Marx with the second disc being a DVD, the second of his career. Accompanying the release of A Night Out With Friends, the live performance video was broadcast on PBS', Front Row Center concert series, episode 109 began airing on May 31, 2012.  Richard Marx' friends, in order of appearance and song performed: Sara Niemietz ("Keep Coming Back"), Matt Scannell ("You're A God"), JC Chasez ("This I Promise You") and Hugh Jackman ("To Where You Are").

Track listing
Disc 1 (CD)
Endless Summer Nights
One Thing Left
Hazard
Through My Veins
When You Loved Me
This I Promise You (with JC Chasez)
The Letter (with Hugh Jackman)
Satisfied
Should've Known Better
Right Here Waiting
Over My Head
Wouldn't Let Me Love You

Disc 2 (DVD)
Endless Summer Nights
Keep Coming Back (with Sara Niemietz)
One Thing Left
Hazard
You're A God (with Matt Scannell)
Hold On To The Nights/Now And Forever
Always On Your Mind
Save Me
Through My Veins
Take This Heart
When You Loved Me
Better Life
This I Promise You (with JC Chasez)
The Letter (with Hugh Jackman)
To Where You Are (with Hugh Jackman)
Angelia
Satisfied
Should've Known Better
The Way She Loves Me
Don't Mean Nothing
Right Here Waiting

References

2012 albums
Richard Marx albums
Albums produced by Richard Marx